Fritt Ord (meaning Free Word in English) was a Norwegian journal, founded in 1931 by theologian Kristian Schjelderup, who later became known as a liberal bishop in the Church of Norway. It was published by Gyldendal in Oslo.

Fritt Ord served as the journal of Landslaget for frilyndt kristendom (National organization of liberal Christians), a liberal organization within the Church of Norway. Schjelderup served as editor from 1931 until 1940 when the journal was discontinued.

References

1931 establishments in Norway
1940 disestablishments in Norway
Christian magazines
Church of Norway
Defunct magazines published in Norway
Magazines established in 1931
Magazines disestablished in 1940
Magazines published in Oslo
Norwegian-language magazines
Religious magazines